Justin Gordon is an American actor, stage director, film producer, and painter. He is known for his work on Mike Flanagan's films Absentia,  Oculus, and Before I Wake.

Life and career 
Born in Bakersfield, California and raised in the small Sierra Nevada town of Posey, Gordon fostered a creative spirit due to the natural solitude and beauty of his hometown surroundings. After attending a summer acting and directing program at Shakespeare's Globe Theatre in London, UK, Gordon went on to obtain his M.F.A. from the University of Illinois at Urbana-Champaign, while working in regional theatre around the United States. He then moved to Los Angeles in 2009. His first major film role was as the by-the-book Detective Lonergan in Mike Flanagan's horror film Absentia, produced by FallBack Plan Productions (where Gordon was a founding partner). Since then, he has appeared in two other of Mike Flanagan's films: Oculus  (serving also as an Associate Producer)  and Before I Wake.

Painting 

In addition to his work in film and theatre, Gordon is an avid painter, working in the style known as action painting, made prominent by Jackson Pollock and Franz Kline.

Filmography

References

External links 
 
 
 Screen Crave Interview

Living people
21st-century American male actors
Film producers from California
American male film actors
American male television actors
Writers from Bakersfield, California
Male actors from California
Year of birth missing (living people)
21st-century American painters